The Palazzo Sanvitale is a palace located on Piazzale Sanvitale #1 in central Parma, region of Emilia-Romagna, Italy. The palace now houses a museum.

History
The palace has undergone a number of reconstructions. In the 18th century, the architect Angelo Rasori, reformulated the center facade in a Neoclassical-style, and built the entry staircase (scalone d'onore). The palace still retains some of the 19th-century interior decoration. In 1951 with the death of Giuseppe Sanvitale, the building was willed to an order of nuns. The palace now belongs to the Fondazione Monte Parma, and since 1999 houses the Museo Amedeo Bocchi focused on the 20th-century Parmesan painter.

References

Sanvitale
Neoclassical architecture in Parma
Museums in Parma
Buildings and structures in Parma
Art museums and galleries in Emilia-Romagna